Coop (real name Chris Cooper) is a hot rod artist working from Los Angeles. He was born in Tulsa, Oklahoma in 1968, and describes his occupation as "Insensitive Artiste." His work consists primarily of barely clothed or nude Bettie Page-style 1950s soft pornography and B-movie monsters, with the female characters often taking the role of "Devil-Women". The image most often associated with his work however is the face of a grinning devil with a smoking cigar clamped in its teeth.

Coop has become popular with certain bands and labels and has provided art for several Sympathy for the Record Industry releases as well as the posters for The Reverend Horton Heat, Lords of Acid, MxPx, Green Day, Nirvana, Soundgarden and Foo Fighters.

Coop is an avid hot rod enthusiast and well known amongst the Kustom Kulture community. He makes an annual appearance at the Mooneyes Xmas party.

He released a book in 2001 called Devil's Advocate: The Art of Coop.  In 2004 he released The Big Fat One, containing 1008 pages of collected sketches, and has recently formed a collaboration with Hot Wheels to sell a series of miniature "Coop-Customized" hot rods. His latest book, Idle Hands, was published in 2012 by Baby Tattoo Books, and focuses on his fine art, dating from 2001 to 2012.

See also
 Lowbrow (art movement)

References

External links
 
 
 Coop's Big Cartel Store the official place for Coop art and merchandise
 Positive Ape Index - Coop's blog
Bizarre Magazine interview with Coop 
Interview with Coop on Deviant Nation
 documentary film featuring Coop

1968 births
Living people
Artists from Tulsa, Oklahoma
Sympathy for the Record Industry artists